Ernest Fear (5 October 1903 – 22 July 1982) was a British sports shooter. He competed in the trap event at the 1956 Summer Olympics.

References

1903 births
1982 deaths
British male sport shooters
Olympic shooters of Great Britain
Shooters at the 1956 Summer Olympics
People from North Somerset (district)
20th-century British people